Košutarica  is a village in Croatia.

Populated places in Sisak-Moslavina County